John Charles Wilson (1892–1968) was a Northern Irish physician and Ulster Unionist Party politician.

Wilson was educated at Queen's University of Belfast, and qualified as a physician. He served in World War I, from 1914 to 1918, in the RAMC.

In the Parliament of Northern Ireland, Wilson was the Member of Parliament (MP) for Iveagh from 1933 to 1938. He was a member of the Orange Order and Masonic Order.

References

1892 births
1968 deaths
Members of the House of Commons of Northern Ireland 1933–1938
Ulster Unionist Party members of the House of Commons of Northern Ireland
Members of the House of Commons of Northern Ireland for County Down constituencies
British Army personnel of World War I
Royal Army Medical Corps officers
Irish Freemasons